My Brother Michael is a novel by Mary Stewart, first published in 1959.

Plot summary

Camilla Haven has recently broken her engagement to Philip and is holidaying on her own in Greece.  She is sitting in a cafe in Athens writing to her friend Elizabeth, expressing insecurity in dealing with travel having been accustomed over 5 years to her ex-fiancé’s handling arrangements, when a man appears with a message about a hired car for Delphi.  Camilla hasn't requested it, but no one else claims the car. She wants to visit Delphi, but was doubtful about being able to afford it. She's told that it is a matter of "life and death", that the person who hired the car for “Monsieur Simon” is “Simon’s girl”, and that the deposit has been paid. After the man leaves the car keys through a misunderstanding, Camilla finds the serendipity of the situation and the temptation to take the car irresistible. Under the pretext of finding out who “Simon” is who needs the car so urgently, she leaves her hotel address with the café's proprietor and sets out to drive the car to Delphi herself

On the way she meets Simon Lester. Simon, who had been a child during the war, is in Greece to learn more about the death of his brother Michael during the Second World War (some 15 years earlier). Michael Lester had been a British Liaison Officer to the Greek partisan group ELAS, and had written a letter home hinting at a significant discovery.

Some of the ruthless antagonists involved in theft, smuggling, and murder during the occupation of Greece in the war have now menacingly re-emerged on the scene. Camilla becomes involved in the increasingly complex and dangerous unraveling of the circumstances of Michael Lester’s death, as well as the rediscovery of an archeological treasure, which now threaten Camilla and Simon.

Books citing My Brother Michael

Aiken, Joan, A Cluster of Separate Sparks, Pocket Books, 1973, page 16
 Barrow, Robin, An Introduction to Philosophy of Education, Routledge, 1989, page 170
 Regis, Pamela, A Natural History of the Romance Novel, University of Pennsylvania Press, 2003

See also
The Top 100 Crime Novels of All Time

1959 British novels
English novels
Novels by Mary Stewart
Novels set in Greece
Hodder & Stoughton books